Sando Harris, (18 May 1963 – 11 June 2021), popularly known by his stage names  Sando Harris  and Sergeant Nallathambi, was an actor in Sri Lankan cinema, theater, 
and television. With a career spanned more than three decades, Sando was a popular comedian in theater and cinema. Apart from comedy acting, he was also a stunt actor, producer, director and singer.

Personal life
He was born on 18 May 1963 in kirulapone, Sri Lanka to a family of eight. He received his primary education at Arethusa College, Wellawatte, and secondary education from Isipathana College and Zahira College, Colombo.

He died on 11 June 2021 at the age of 58. The cause is identified as a sudden cardiac arrest occurred when he was at his friend's residence in No. 291/47, Havelock Place, Colombo. After the post mortem at Kalubowila Hospital, the body was taken to the Dehiwala cemetery and the last rites was performed on 13 June 2021.

Career
Sando entered the drama in association with Kirulapone when in the company of renowned comedian Nihal Silva. With Nihal's death, he took the role that Nihal created 'Sergeant Nallathambi' and later created a new stage play called Cheriyo Sergeant. The play staged more than 2500 scenes island-wide as well as in 23 countries.

He made his film debut in 1990 film Jayashakthi. Since then he has acted with many supporting and minor roles in more than 150 films including: Hitha Honda Putek, Ran Hadawatha, Raja Daruvō, Sathyā, Ekadā Væhi, Demōdara Pālama and Quē Serā. In 1997 he won the Best Actor Award for Wedage Kendare. Although he entered the film industry as a stuntman, he was also involved in stunt direction as well  His first stunt direction came through the 1999 film Ekadā Væhi. He later directed stunts in the film Seethala Gini Kandu. He also made a supporting role in the 2013 critics acclaimed film A Common Man directed by Chandran Rutnam.
In 2015 he won SriLankan 1st award best actor in comedy role award in Derana films award for "que sera" movie.the movie directed by Late Mr.Parakkrama Jayasinghe.

In television, he acted in the serials: Yuga Vilakkuwa. However, he became popular as a comedian shortly afterwards. He produced many comedy stage plays with the role 'Nallathambi' such as: Sergeanṭgē Nændammā, Doctor Chicāgō and Kōchchi Manamālayā. The play Doctor Chicago continued for about three years. In 2015, He won the best comedy actor  award for the first time in Sri Lankan film festivals at the Derana Film Awards for the film Que Sera. Since 2017, he worked on his debut direction King of Diyawannawa which could not complete due to his demise.

In addition to acting, he also served as a Justice of the Peace.

Filmography

References

External links
 

1963 births
2021 deaths
Sri Lankan male film actors
Sri Lankan male stage actors
Sri Lankan male television actors
Sri Lankan Muslims
Sri Lankan theatre directors
People from Colombo District